Mercury and Psyche (German: Merkur und Psyche) is an 1878 marble sculpture by Reinhold Begas, housed at the entrance to the Alte Nationalgalerie in Berlin, Germany.

See also

 1878 in art

External links
 

1878 sculptures
1878 establishments in Germany
Marble sculptures in Germany
Sculptures of men in Germany
Sculptures of women in Germany
Statues in Germany
Works by German people